"That's How It Is" is a song by American hip hop artist Casual. The song was recorded for his debut album Fear Itself (1994) and released as the debut single from the album in August 1993.

Track listing
12", Vinyl
"That's How It Is" (LP Version) - 3:07
"That's How It Is" (Disseshowedo Mix) - 3:40
"That's How It Is" (Acapella) - 2:40
"Thoughts of the Thoughtful" (LP Version) - 2:56
"That's How It Is" (LP Instrumental) - 3:07

Personnel
Information taken from Discogs.
production – Del tha Funkee Homosapien, Domino
remixing – Casual

Chart performance

Notes

External links

1993 singles
Casual (rapper) songs
1993 songs
Jive Records singles